Michael Siltala (born August 5, 1963) is a Canadian retired ice hockey player. He played 7 games in the National Hockey League with the Washington Capitals and New York Rangers between 1981 and 1987. The rest of his career, which lasted from 1981 to 1989, was mainly spent in the minor leagues.

Playing career
Siltala was born in Toronto, Ontario. As a youth, he played in the 1976 Quebec International Pee-Wee Hockey Tournament with a minor ice hockey team from Sault Ste. Marie, Ontario. Originally drafted in 1981 by the Washington Capitals, Siltala played in three games for the Capitals, and later four more games with the New York Rangers.

Career statistics

Regular season and playoffs

References

External links

1963 births
Living people
Binghamton Whalers players
Canadian ice hockey right wingers
Hershey Bears players
Kingston Canadians players
New Haven Nighthawks players
New York Rangers players
Schwenningen ERC players
Ice hockey people from Toronto
Washington Capitals draft picks
Washington Capitals players